In mathematics, specifically in differential topology, a Kervaire manifold  is a piecewise-linear manifold of dimension  constructed by  by plumbing together the tangent bundles of two -spheres, and then gluing a ball to the result. In 10 dimensions this gives a piecewise-linear manifold with no smooth structure.

See also
 Exotic sphere

References

 

Differential topology
Manifolds